The Vocational Agriculture Building (also known as the Little Red School House) was built by the Works Projects Administration (WPA) in 1938 with funding from the Flagler County Board of Public Instruction and the WPA. It is located at 1001 E. Howe St., Bunnell, Florida, United States. Interestingly, it never served as a schoolhouse as it was used as Bunnell High School's vocational agriculture department and housed the local chapter of the Future Farmers of America, which is now known as the National FFA Organization. The building is also often mistaken for a one-room schoolhouse, but it actually has two large rooms and a smaller storage room. This building is one of only three structures built in Flagler County during the Great Depression with funding provided by New Deal dollars. The other two are the Bunnell Coquina City Hall and the Flagler County Jail (WPA-Built).

On February 21, 2007, it was added to the U.S. National Register of Historic Places.

WPA Project

In November 1936, the Flagler County Board of Public Instruction met with G. A. Duncan, a representative of the Florida State Planning Board, to discuss ideas and future plans to improve the county's public school infrastructure.

The school board turned to Zachary D. Holland, the local Works Projects Administration (WPA) supervisor, for assistance in completing its WPA application, which was authorized for funding in late 1937. The federal agency agreed to supply the labor, or approximately eighty percent of the cost of the project, and the school board paid for the materials. In January 1938, the school board developed a materials list, which included 8,000 common hard bricks and 15,000 rough, or craft, textured bricks, Portland cement, builder's lime, and various finished wood products and sizes of nails. A Bunnell builder's supply store, Johnsons Incorporated, was awarded the materials bid. WPA supervisor Holland broke ground on the project later that month, anticipating construction to be completed in mid-1938. Holland completed the new school building in July 1938, and delivered the keys to the school board. The cost of construction amounted to $5,091.22 of which the school board provided $1,474.22.

The physical plant of the high school consisted of four buildings: the main brick high school, the brick vocational agriculture building, a small wood-frame structure with tin sheathing for five buses, and a small wood-frame janitorial storage building.

FFA Training

Under the leadership of Joe Norfleet, the Vocational Agriculture Department and local chapter of the FFA initiated use of the building in the 1938–1939 school year as the Smith-Hughes Vocational Agriculture course was added into the high school's curriculum as an elective.  Students met daily in the building, studying agricultural topics and planting methods in the classroom, working on projects in the shop, and traveling to nearby agricultural fields to plant, cultivate, and harvest crops. Between 1938 and 1942, students held fund-raising activities to travel to Havana, Cuba, World's Fair in New York City, Washington, D. C., and the Florida State Fair in Tampa.

In 1940, the Bunnell FFA chapter earned the highest rank in Florida's FFA high school statewide program. Judges assessed students for achievement in community service leadership, cooperative activities, earnings and savings from demonstration plots, and recreational and scholarship activities.

Usage as a Storage Facility

The building housed the school's vocational agriculture training and FFA activities until 1970, when a fire severely damaged the main two-story high school building. After considerable debate, the high school was rebuilt at a new site on State Road 100 and Bunnell  Elementary School was relocated to the old high school campus and re-built. Although the former high school building was razed and the hard-fire brick salvaged for resale, the former vocational agriculture building remained untouched. In the process of the clearing of the former foundations and construction of the new elementary school, the former agriculture building became a storage facility and then a liability that was boarded up and not maintained.

Restoration into a Living Museum

In 1986, three teachers: Nell Brown, Betty Latham, and Diane Marquis initiated an effort to save the building from imminent destruction, and restore it as a little red schoolhouse museum. After receiving approval from the Flagler County School Board, the teachers embarked on fund raising efforts under the aegis of the Friends of the Little Red Schoolhouse. Brown and Latham left the following year for positions at the newly built Wadsworth Elementary School in Palm Coast. Assisted by faculty and staff members Richard DuPont, Nancy McFeeley, and Nancy Willis, Marquis led the effort to carry on the vision of rescuing the building from deterioration and destruction. Marquis secured contributions for the preservation project from many organizations, including the Bunnell Elementary School Parent-Teacher Organization, Cultural Heritage Study Group, Flagler Beach Women's Club, Hammock Women's Club, ITT-Palm Coast, and Palm Coast Women's Club. Among other activities, school children made small miniatures of the old school for placement in stores and businesses in the community to collect funds and promote awareness of the project. Her efforts were supplemented in 1992 with a Blueprint 2000 grant for $10,000 from the Florida Legislature. In addition to obtaining financial resources.

On November 15, 1993, the building was dedicated as the Little Red
Schoolhouse Museum.

Living Museum Artifacts

Marquis collected various furnishings and antiques for the building, including a blackboard, books, chairs, and desks. Built in 1942, one cabinet was donated by Rem Murray, a former student who fabricated the furniture in the building as a vocational project. Among the artifacts are original wood school desks, many pictures and newspaper articles, Native American artifacts, as 48 star U.S.A. flag, an August 27, 1918 original signed letter from Mary McLeod Bethune when she was principal of the Daytona Educational and Industrial Training School for Negro Girls Incorporated and a March 3, 1932 letter to Charles Lindberg regarding the kidnapping of his son from Z.E. Booe, Flagler County Superintendent of Public Instruction.

References

External links

 Flagler County Historical Society.
 Flagler County, Florida.
 History.com's Works Progress Administration (WPA)

Tourist attractions in Florida
Works Progress Administration in Florida
Buildings and structures in Flagler County, Florida
National Register of Historic Places in Flagler County, Florida
School buildings on the National Register of Historic Places in Florida
Education in Flagler County, Florida
1938 establishments in Florida
School buildings completed in 1938
National FFA Organization